Out of the Woods is the second solo album by Tracey Thorn. It was released on 5 March 2007 on Virgin Records. The album charted on the Billboard 200, peaking at number 172 on 7 April 2007.

The majority of the album's production was by Ewan Pearson who also produced the first single, "It's All True". Other collaborators included Cagedbaby, Charles Webster, Klas Lindblad, Martin Wheeler and Alex Santos.

Background
Out of the Woods marked Thorn's full-time return to the music scene after an absence of over six years. It was released on 20 March 2007 in the U.S. on Astralwerks.

Thorn told Billboard magazine about the recording of the album:
Thorn namechecked post-punk peers and idols Terry Hall (from 2-Tone Records ska-revivalists The Specials, and New Pop trio Fun Boy Three), Edwyn Collins (of Postcard Records' Orange Juice) and Siouxsie Sioux in the song "Hands Up to the Ceiling". The record also includes contributions from Cagedbaby, Ewan Pearson, Charles Webster, Sasse, Darshan Jesrani, Martin Wheeler and Alex Santos.

Critical reception

At Metacritic, which assigns a weighted average score out of 100 to reviews from mainstream critics, the album received an average score of 76, based on 20 reviews, indicating "generally favorable reviews".

Singles 
The first single from the album, "It's All True", accompanied by remixes from the likes of Kris Menace & Martin Buttrich, was released on 7 February and the second single, "Raise the Roof" was released on 18 June. The third single, "Grand Canyon" was released on 30 October. A fourth single, "King's Cross" (which is a cover version of a Pet Shop Boys song) was released on 12 December.

Track listing

Charts

References

External links
 
 Tracey Thorn surprises herself with pop album
 Q&A: Tracey Thorn
 Tracey Thorn official Myspace

2007 albums
Virgin Records albums
Astralwerks albums
Tracey Thorn albums